Daybees Search (or Daybees Event Search) is a web-based vertical search engine for events. Daybees was the first application of its type designed specifically for events.

About

When the UK beta website launched in March 2013, Daybees had over 230 event categories with over 1.5 million happenings of all kinds, making it one of the largest event-based search engines on the web. The process for generating event listings is primarily by web scraping, using algorithms with web crawlers, to find any events taking place. Event data is extracted from the crawled event pages and assimilated into a data stack. This is then formatted, tagged, categorized and compiled. A software-based merging tool is used to avoid duplication, so that the same events listed on a number of different web sites, register as the same one. The user-interface provides an accessible way for Daybees users to find events.

Mobile platforms 

The Daybees Event Finder mobile app was released for iOS devices on 1 June 2013, followed by support for Android devices on 5 June 2013. The Daybees mobile app was listed as one of the best new apps of July 2013 and in "Apps of the Week" and "Picks of the Week" for August 2013. The app has a feature which enables users to add their own events that can be shared with selected personal connections.

Draft versions of iconic movie posters 

Bill Gold, granted Daybees permission to publish their exploratory conceptual development work for movies including The Exorcist, Ocean's Eleven (2001 film), Pulp Fiction, and A Clockwork Orange (film). This collection was released in 2013.Crawlers (Into the Dark)

References

External links 
 
 Iconic movie poster draft designs

Internet search engines
British websites